Faces in the Crowd may refer to:

Faces in the Crowd (Sports Illustrated), a segment in the magazine Sports Illustrated
Faces in the Crowd (play), a 2008 play by Leo Butler
Faces in the Crowd (film), a 2011 crime drama horror thriller film
Faces in the Crowd (novel), a 2011 Mexican novel

See also
A Face in the Crowd (disambiguation)